The 2014–15 Highland Football League  kicked off on 2 August 2014. Due to the introduction of end-of-season promotion playoffs, all matches affecting the title or involving the champions had to be completed on or before 18 April 2015, though other matches could still take place after this date. The last match of the season was played on 9 May 2015.

Defending champions Brora Rangers secured their second consecutive league title on 28 March 2015 with a 2–1 win over closest rivals Turriff United F.C. at The Haughs and went on to finish the season without losing a match, the first club to do so since Caledonian in 1982–83. They also achieved new Highland League records for both the most goals scored (134) and fewest conceded (13), having kept a clean sheet in 23 of their 34 matches.

Starting in this season, the league champions playoff with the Lowland Football League champions (or other eligible team from outside the SPFL to be nominated by the Scottish FA), with the winner then playing the team finishing 10th and bottom in Scottish League Two in a promotion and relegation playoff to determine the entrants for the 2015–16 League Two season. In the playoffs, Brora Rangers narrowly beat Lowland League champions Edinburgh City but lost the final playoff against League Two club Montrose, and will therefore remain in an unchanged Highland League roster for the 2015–16 season.

League table

Results

Promotion play-off

As champions, Brora Rangers played off against the winners of the Lowland Football League, Edinburgh City over two legs. Brora won on penalties and went on to play off against the bottom-placed club in Scottish League Two, Montrose. Montrose won 3–2 on aggregate, therefore Brora Rangers remain in the Highland League for the 2015–16 season.

References

Highland Football League seasons
5
Scottish